Heptapleurum sp. nov. 'nanocephala' is a undescribed species of plant in the family Araliaceae. It was placed in Schefflera previously. It is a tree endemic to Peninsular Malaysia. Its natural habitat is subtropical or tropical moist montane forests. It is threatened by habitat loss.

References

nanocephala
Endemic flora of Peninsular Malaysia
Trees of Peninsular Malaysia
Vulnerable plants
Undescribed plant species
Taxonomy articles created by Polbot